Edward Sebastian Palubinskas (born 17 September 1950) is an Australian former professional basketball player and coach.

Playing career

High school
Palubinskas attended Narrabundah High Schoo in Canberra, where he practiced different sports (swimming, track and field, football, gymnastics). He started playing basketball at age 14. In Canberra, he played for a team of Lithuanian immigrants. After moving to Melbourne, Palubinskas played for the St. Kilda Saints, winning the Victorian Championship in 1970.

College
Coach Lindsay Gaze, who back then considered Palubinskas as "the best offensive player in the history of Australia", put him in contact with Dale Brown, who later became his coach at LSU. Palubinskas moved to the US and started his collegiate career at Ricks College in Rexburg, Idaho in 1970, where he led the US in free throw percentage with 92.4 percents during the 1970–71 season. He holds the record for the most consecutive free throws in a game (14) and 43 consecutive for the season. He won NJCAA All-American status at Ricks College (which is now BYU-Idaho) and scored 24 points a game over his two years. In 1972, Palubinskas transferred to Louisiana State University (LSU), after playing in the Munich Olympics where he was the second leading scorer missing the Olympic scoring title by one point. At LSU, Palubinskas had a team-high 18.6 points per game in the 1972–73 season and was selected to the All-SEC Coaches Team. In 1973–74, he was the second leading scorer of the team (18.3 points per game) behind Glenn Hansen. While at LSU, Palubinskas hit 87.5 percent (258-of-295) of his free throws. On 1 March 1973, Palubinskas converted 16 of his 16 free throws against Mississippi State, which put him in first place in the LSU record book.

Professional
Palubinskas was selected in the 1974 NBA draft by the Atlanta Hawks in the fourth round. He was then traded to the New Orleans Jazz and drafted in the eighth round of the ABA draft by the Utah Stars. Palubinskas never played in the NBA. In Australia, he played for the Caulfield Spartans, scoring a record-breaking 66 points in a championship game in 1976.

National team career
After being the second leading scorer in the 1972 Summer Olympics in Munich, Palubinskas was the top overall scorer in 1976 Summer Olympics in Montreal. He set three Olympic scoring records in Montreal, including the record for most points scored in a single Olympics (269), which was broken by Brazilian Oscar Schmidt during the 1988 Summer Olympics. The most points he scored in one game during the Olympics was in 1976, when he had 48 against Mexico in overtime.

He is a member of the Basketball Australia Hall of Fame.

Coaching career
Palubinskas served as an assistant coach at Brigham Young University from 1986 to 1989. In 1991–92, he held the same position at Louisiana State University. At the high school level in the US, Palubinskas was the head coach at Central Private School in Central, Louisiana from 1992 to 1996. He also was a basketball coach at East Carbon High School in Sunnyside, Utah and East High School in Salt Lake City.

Palubinskas took a position as shooting coach to Shaquille O'Neal with the Los Angeles Lakers for the 2000–01 NBA season. Following the Lakers' triumph in the NBA, Palubinskas also received an NBA champion's ring. He also worked with Brandon Bass, Dwight Howard, Lisa Leslie and Lauren Jackson. He has his own basketball school named The Palubinskas Basketball Academy. Palubinskas published two instructional video tapes ("Secrets to Perfect Shooting Principles" and "The Shooters' Lab") on shooting technique. In 2004, he published his findings on shooting the basketball in the FIBA Assist Magazine.

Career highlights
 "Mr. Basketball Australia" – 1970
 1972 and 1976 All-World Olympic Team
 Most points scored in Olympic history (269) – 1976
 Guinness book world record- most free throws (18) made in 2 minutes blindfolded in Phoenix AZ. at NBA ALL-Star weekend 
ACT Sport Hall of Fame inductee in 2021

Personal life
Palubinskas was born to a Lithuanian father and a Russian mother.

References

External links
 Historical Vignette: Ed Palubinskas, Australia's first basketball great – Australian Olympic Committee
 

1950 births
Living people
Atlanta Hawks draft picks
Australian emigrants to the United States
Australian Latter Day Saints
Australian men's basketball coaches
Australian men's basketball players
1974 FIBA World Championship players
Australian people of Lithuanian descent
Australian people of Russian descent
Basketball players at the 1972 Summer Olympics
Basketball players at the 1976 Summer Olympics
Junior college men's basketball players in the United States
Los Angeles Lakers assistant coaches
LSU Tigers basketball coaches
LSU Tigers basketball players
Olympic basketball players of Australia
Sportspeople from Canberra
Utah Stars draft picks